Currito of the Cross (Spanish: Currito de la Cruz) is a 1965 Spanish drama film directed by Rafael Gil and starring Francisco Rabal, Arturo Fernandez and El Pireo. It is an adaptation of the novel of the same title by Alejandro Pérez Lugín.

Cast
    Francisco Rabal as Manuel Carmona 
 Arturo Fernández as Ángel Romera 'Romerita'  
 El Pireo as Currito de la Cruz  
 Soledad Miranda as Rocío Carmona  
 José Marco Davó as Don Emilio  
 Adrián Ortega as Don Ismael  
 Luis Ferrín as Gazuza  
 Yelena Samarina as Teresa  
 Ángel Álvarez as Don Antonio  
 Julia Gutiérrez Caba as Madre María 
 Mercedes Vecino as Doña Manuela Alonso, viuda de Varela  
 Manolo Morán as Copita 
 Juan Cortés as Comisario  
 Rafael Durán as Carmona 
 Carlos Mendy as Pintao

References

Bibliography
 Labanyi, Jo & Pavlović, Tatjana. A Companion to Spanish Cinema. John Wiley & Sons, 2012.

External links 

1965 films
1965 drama films
Spanish drama films
1960s Spanish-language films
Films based on Spanish novels
Films based on works by Alejandro Pérez Lugín
Films directed by Rafael Gil
1960s Spanish films